= Turkic Speaking Countries Cooperation Day =

- Observed by: Azerbaijan Kazakhstan Kyrgyzstan Turkey Uzbekistan
- Type: International
- Date: 3 October

Cooperation Day of Turkic Speaking Countries is celebrated on 3 October every year. As a result of the Nakhchivan Agreement signed between Turkey, Azerbaijan, Kazakhstan and Kyrgyzstan on October 3, 2009, the Day of Cooperation of Turkic Speaking Countries was declared and celebrated on October 3, the signing date of this agreement.
